Music School is an upcoming Indian musical film made in Telugu and Hindi languages directed by Papa Rao Biyyala, starring Shriya Saran, Prakash Raj and Sharman Joshi in important roles. The principal photography of the film started on 15 November 2021. The film has 12 songs, with 9 of them composed by Maestro Ilaiyaraaja.

Summary 
Music School is about the pressure applied by school systems and parents on children to continue with endless hours of studies, only studies.. thinking of making them doctors and engineers, thereby leaving no time for art and leisure activities for the students.

Cast 
 
Shriya Saran
Prakash Raj
Sharman Joshi
Suhasini Mulay
Mona Ambegaonkar
Benjamin Gilani
Gracy Goswami
Shaan
Brahmanandam
Bugs Bhargava Krishna
Thanmai Bolt
Aripirala Satyaprasad
Leela Samson
Siddhiksha
Ozu Barua
Vinay Varma
Olivia Charan
Srikanth Iyengar
G Rohan Roy

Production
Papa Rao Biyyala, a sports administrator and former member of the Indian Administrative Service (IAS), launched himself as feature film director with Music School, a musical, produced by the Hyderabad-based company Yamini Films. Choreographer Adam Murray, who worked in The King's Man, Cruella and Rocketman was the first among signed technicians. Ilaiyaraaja was signed as the composer of the film, who orchestrated and recorded the background score of the in Budapest, Hungary. Apart from Ilaiyaraaja's 9 songs, the film also includes three songs from the Oscar-winning classic The Sound of Music and those were orchestrated by the London Philharmonic Orchestra. The film wrapped up its third schedule on 12 March 2022 and the complete pack up happened on 6 June 2022.

See also 
The Sound of Music

References

External links
 

Indian musical films
Indian multilingual films
Upcoming films
Upcoming Hindi-language films
Upcoming Telugu-language films
Films scored by Ilaiyaraaja